Ambasan is a village in Mehsana Taluka of Mehsana district in the state of Gujarat, India.

Places of interest 
There are ruins of some ancient temples nearby which are archaeologically important. Other major temples include Annapurna Devi temple, Parshwanath Jain temple and Hanuman temple.

Amenities 

There are schools, hospital and post office in the village.

References

Villages in Mehsana district